Black Christmas is a Canadian-American horror film series that comprises three standalone slasher films, as well as a novelization. The original film has gained a large cult following and is credited as being one of the first slasher films, inspiring many others, including the critically acclaimed hit Halloween (1978). The series centers around a serial killer that stalks and murders a group of sorority sisters. The 1974 film follows the character of Jess Bradford as she and her sorority sisters begin receiving threatening phone calls from an unknown stalker. The 2006 film explores the background and motivation for the killer and his family. The 2019 film completely abandons the first two films' killer storyline, instead focusing on a new set of characters and killers.

Billy, Jess, and Mrs. MacHenry are the only characters to appear in more than one film.

Films

Overview

Black Christmas (1974)

The first in the series was the 1974 Canadian slasher film, Black Christmas (1974), which was directed by Bob Clark, and based on a screenplay by A. Roy Moore. Upon its release, the film received a mixed critical response and was a moderate financial success, and has since gained cult status. The plot follows Jess Bradford, a college student who begins receiving threatening phone calls, as the women in her sorority house begin to disappear.

Black X-Mas (2006)

The critically panned 2006 remake was written and directed by Glen Morgan. The story delved heavily into the mythology of Billy, whose identity and motives were only vaguely hinted at in the original film. Both Morgan and producer James Wong revealed that the film suffered studio interference with Dimension executives Bob and Harvey Weinstein pushing for numerous re-writes and re-shoots to invoke more violence, which contrasted with Morgan's original vision for the film, and caused an inconsistency in tone. Despite negative reviews and the Christmas release date causing controversy, the film was a commercial success.

Black Christmas (2019)

Shortly after the release of the 2006 remake, a direct sequel to the 1974 film was in development, which would have focused solely on Olivia Hussey's character. However, the film was scrapped following the death of Clark, who was killed by a drunk driver, on April 4, 2007.

In June 2019, Sophia Takal signed on to direct another remake, having previously worked with Jason Blum on his Into the Dark series for Hulu, while Imogen Poots, Aleyse Shannon, Brittany O'Grady, Lily Donoghue, and Caleb Eberhardt signed on in starring roles. Cary Elwes also joined the cast.

Principal cast and characters

Additional crew and production details

Reception

Box office and financial performance

Critical and public response

Literature
A novelization of the 1974 film written by Lee Hays was published in 1976 by Popular Library.

See also
 List of films featuring home invasions
 Holiday horror
 List of films set around Christmas

References

American film series
 
Film series introduced in 1974
Slasher film series